Old Bolshevik (stary bolshevik), also called Old Bolshevik Guard or Old Party Guard, was an unofficial designation for a member of the Bolshevik faction of the Russian Social Democratic Labour Party before the Russian Revolution of 1917. Many Old Bolsheviks became leading politicians and bureaucrats in the Soviet Union and the ruling Communist Party. Most died over the years from natural causes, but a number were removed from power or executed in the late 1930s, as a result of the Great Purge by Joseph Stalin.

Overview

Definition 
Initially, the term "Old Bolshevik" (ста́рый большеви́к, stary bolshevik) referred to Bolsheviks who joined the Russian Social Democratic Labour Party before 1905. On February 13, 1922, under the chairmanship of the Old Bolshevik historian Mikhail Olminsky, the Society of Old Bolsheviks (Общество старых большевиков) at the Istpart (Commission on the Study of the History of the October Revolution and RCP(b)) was established. The first Statute required membership before January 1, 1905, with admission in some cases of other Social Democrats with the same career time who later joined the Bolsheviks.

Initially there were 64 members. Later it was renamed the All-Union Society. The 1931 Statute had a requirement of a continuous party membership of at least 18 years, with exceptions to be granted by the Society Presidium (approved by the Society Council). By 1934, there were over 2,000 members. The All-Union Society was self-dissolved in 1935, announcing that "it has completed its tasks". Vadim Rogovin cites the statistics published by the 13th Congress of the Russian Communist Party (Bolsheviks) that, in 1924, of 600,000 Party members, 0.6% joined before 1905, 2% joined in 1906–1916 and <9% joined in 1917.

Vladimir Lenin wrote about the "enormous, undivided authority of that thinnest layer, which can be called the old party guard". Old Bolsheviks that were part of Lenin's inner-circle or directly worked with him formed a sub-designation known as the Lenin Guard (Ленинская гвардия, leninskaya gvardiya).

Over time the definition of "Old Bolsheviks" became more lax. For example, according to a 1972 Soviet book by D. A. Chygayev, in 1922 there were as many as 44,148 Old Bolsheviks.

Presence in the Soviet Union 

By the end of the Russian Revolution in 1923, Old Bolsheviks filled many of the powerful positions in the state apparatus of the Soviet Union, its constituent republics, and the ruling All-Union Communist Party. By the mid-1930s, General Secretary Joseph Stalin and the upper ranks of the party were predicting that major social upheaval would occur in the aftermath of the forced collectivization process since 1928 and the subsequent Soviet famine of 1932–1933. 

Stalin, himself an Old Bolshevik, became paranoid of challenges to his rule from within the party, fearing that Old Bolsheviks were potential usurpers who could exploit the upheaval and use their prestige to depose him. Stalin used the assassination of Sergei Kirov in 1934 as a pretext to purge the party, and removed a great part of the surviving Old Bolsheviks from positions of power during the Great Purge from 1936 to 1938. 

Purged Old Bolsheviks were condemned in a series of show trials known as the Moscow Trials, and then executed for treason or sent as prisoners to the Gulag system of labor camps. By 1938, the number of Old Bolsheviks who remained in power (other than Stalin himself) was small, and the vacant positions were filled by a younger generation of party members who were considered to be more loyal to Stalin himself.

Various things in the Soviet Union had the name Old Bolshevik, such as a publishing house, several steamships, motorboats, kolkhozes and populated places.

Fate of some of the Old Bolsheviks 
Note that CC stands for Central Committee of the Communist Party.

Died before the Purge

Some of those executed in the Purge

Survived

See also 
 Alter Kämpfer
 Bibliography of the Russian Revolution and Civil War
 Bibliography of Stalinism and the Soviet Union

References 

Factions in the Communist Party of the Soviet Union
 
Soviet phraseology